John Curzon may refer to:

Sir John Curzon, 1st Baronet (c. 1599–1686), MP for Derbyshire
Sir John Curzon, 3rd Baronet (1674–1727), MP for Derbyshire
John Curzon (cricketer) (born 1954), English former first-class cricketer

See also
Curzon (disambiguation)